Kəndoba (also, Kendoba and Kyandoba) is a village and municipality in the Agsu Rayon of Azerbaijan.  It has a population of 2,104.

References 

Populated places in Agsu District